The five provinces of Rwanda are divided into 30 districts (Kinyarwanda: uturere, sing. akarere). Each district is in turn divided into sectors (Kinyarwanda: imirenge, sing. umurenge), which are in turn divided into cells (Kinyarwanda: utugali, sing. akagali), which are in turn divided into villages (Kinyarwanda: imidugudu, sing. umudugudu).

Prior to 2002, Rwanda was composed of prefectures, subprefectures (which were sometimes called "districts") and 154 communes (Kinyarwanda: imijyi, sing. umujyi). In 2002, communes were replaced by two kinds of divisions called districts and municipalities (Kinyarwanda: akarere and umujyi). In 2006, the number of districts was reduced from 106 to 30.

The districts are listed below, by province.

Current list of districts by province

Eastern Province

 Bugesera
 Gatsibo
 Kayonza
 Kirehe
 Ngoma
 Nyagatare
 Rwamagana

Kigali

 Gasabo
 Kicukiro
 Nyarugenge

Northern Province

 Burera
 Gakenke
 Gicumbi
 Musanze
 Rulindo

Southern Province

 Gisagara
 Huye
 Kamonyi
 Muhanga
 Nyamagabe
 Nyanza
 Nyaruguru
 Ruhango

Western Province

 Karongi
 Ngororero
 Nyabihu
 Nyamasheke
 Rubavu
 Rusizi
 Rutsiro

Former list of districts by province (2002–2006)

City of Kigali
 Nyarugenge
 Nyamirambo
 Butamwa
 Gisozi
 Kacyiru
 Kanombe
 Kicukiro
 Gikondo

Kigali Rural Province
 Kabuga Town
 Bicumbi
 Gashora
 Ngenda
 Nyarnata
 Shyorongi
 Rushashi
 Rulindo
 Buliza
 Gasabo

Gitarama Province
 Gitarama Town
 Ruyumba
 Ntongwe
 Ruhango Town
 Kabagari
 Ntenyo
 Muhanga
 Ndiza
 Kayumbu
 Kamonyi

Butare Province
 Butare Town
 Save
 Mugombwa
 Kibingo
 Nyakizu
 Maraba
 Kiruhura
 Nyanza Town
 Nyamure
 Gikonko

Gikongoro Province
 Gikongoro Town
 Mubuga
 Nshili
 Mudasomwa
 Mushubi
 Kaduha
 Karaba
 Rwamiko

Cyangugu Province
 Cyangugu Town
 Impala
 Nyamasheke
 Gatare
 Bukunzi
 Bugarama
 Gashonga

Kibuye Province
 Kibuye Town
 Gisunzu
 Rutsiro
 Budaha
 Itabire
 Rusenyi

Gisenyi Province
 Gisenyi Town
 Cyanzarwe
 Mutura
 Gasiza
 Kageyo
 Nyagisagara
 Gaseke
 Kayove
 Kanama
 Nyamyumba

Ruhengeri Province
 Ruhengeri Town
 Bugarura
 Nyarutovu
 Bukonya
 Buhoma
 Mutobo
 Kinigi
 Bukamba
 Butaro
 Cyeru
 Nyamugali

Byumba Province
 Byumba Town1
 Kisaro
 Kinihira
 Bungwe
 Rushaki
 Rebero
 Ngarama
 Humure
 Rwamiko

Umutara Province
 Umutara Town
 Bugaragara
 Kabarore
 Gabiro
 Rukara
 Murambi
 Kahi
 Muvumba

Kibungo Province
 Kibungo Town
 Kigarama
 Mirenge
 Rwamagana Town
 Muhazi
 Kabarondo
 Cyarubare
 Rukira
 Nyarubuye
 Rusumo

Communes of Rwanda (pre-2002)

See also
 List of Rwanda districts by population
 Provinces of Rwanda

References

 
Subdivisions of Rwanda
Rwanda, Districts
Rwanda 2
Districts, Rwanda
Rwanda geography-related lists